Elisabeth Braadland Dored (22 March 1908 – 6 September 1972) was a Norwegian artist and author.

Biography
Elisabeth Sophie Wiel Braadland   was born at Idd (now Halden) in Østfold,  Norway. Her parents were Birger Braadland  (1879-1960) and Ragna Abigael Vogt Stang (1881-1972). She studied art at the Académie Scandinave  in Paris under Henry de Waroquier (1881-1970) and trained at the Académie de l'Art Moderne with Othon Friesz (1879-1949) during  1929. She attended the Norwegian National Academy of Fine Arts in Oslo  where she studied under Halfdan Strøm in 1931.

In 1935, she married  Latvian born cinematographer John Dored (1881-1954). She debuted as an author with For meg er jorden rund (1955) in which she  tells about the life and career of her husband.

She won the  Norwegian Booksellers' Prize (Bokhandlerprisen)  in 1964 for her historic romance novel Jeg elsket Tiberius. The novel was  translated into English by Naomi Walford.  During 1963, the novel was published under the title  I Loved Tiberius in Great Britain by Methuen Publishing and in the United States by Pantheon Books.

See also 
List of historical novelists
List of Norwegian writers

References

1908 births
1972 deaths
People from Østfold
Oslo National Academy of the Arts alumni
20th-century Norwegian novelists
Norwegian women novelists
20th-century Norwegian women writers
Norwegian artists